The Arizona Kid is a 1970 low-budgeted Philippine comedy western directed by Luciano B. Carlos and starring Chiquito, Gordon Mitchell, and Mamie Van Doren.

Cast
Chiquito as Ambo, the Arizona Kid 
Gordon Mitchell as "Coyote" 
Mamie Van Doren as Sharon Miller 
Mariela Branger as Pamela
Bernard Bonnin as Leonardo
Dan van Husen as Billy, the first outlaw leader
Víctor Israel as Frank, the second outlaw leader
Pilar Velázquez
Angel Aranda
Tony Brandt
John Mark

References

External links

1970 films
Philippine comedy films
1970s Western (genre) comedy films
1970 comedy films
Films directed by Luciano B. Carlos
1970s English-language films